Blurr is a 2022 Indian Hindi-language horror thriller film. It has been directed by Ajay Bahl and jointly produced by Zee Studios, Outsiders Films and Echelon Productions. The film features Taapsee Pannu and Gulshan Devaiah in the leading roles. This is Taapsee Pannu's first project as a producer.

The film premiered on 9 December 2022 on ZEE5.

Cast 
 Taapsee Pannu as Gayatri/Gautami
 Gulshan Devaiah as Neel
 Kruttika Desai Khan as Mrs. Radha Solanki
 Abhilash Thapliyal as Chander
 Sorabh Chauhan as Bipin Nath
 Nitya Mathur as Ira
 Sumit Nijhawan as Mahendra Chandel

Plot
The film is the official Hindi remake of Spanish film Julia's Eyes. 

The story is about one woman, Gayatri, finding about the untimely death of her twin sister, who was visually impaired. She then tries to uncover the mystery behind the death while struggling with her own eyesight.

Production 
The principal photography of the film began in July 2021. The film was wrapped up on 31 August 2021.

Since the protagonist of the film is visually impaired, Taapsee Pannu shot part of the film blindfolded to get the character right.

Promotions
The teaser of the movie was released on November 20, 2022.  As a part of the promotion, the movie was screened for a visually impaired audience.

Soundtrack 

The music of the film is composed by Aditya Pushkarna, Rishi Dutta and Shivangi Bhayana while the lyrics are written by Srushti Tawade and Akshay The One.

Critical Reception
Anna M. M. Vetticad of Firstpost rated the film 3 out of 5 stars, and praised the atmospherics, camera work and Taapsee Pannu’s performance. She wrote, "The larger message Blurr is aiming at gives it an interesting additional layer, even though it is not fully realised." Roktim Rajpal for India Today wrote "Taapsee puts her best foot forward and excels in a few inherently intense scenes. That said, one gets the feeling that she does not get enough scope to internalise the characters." Tanul Thakur of The Wire wrote, "But Blurr resists the easy temptations, finding fresh ways to divulge personality, solidify tension, spring surprise." It  also earned praises from Saibal Chatterjee who wrote,"The film never loses sight of its primary purpose - delivering a thriller that makes the most of its resources while staying within its chosen parameters."

References

External links 
 
 Blurr on ZEE5

Indian remakes of Spanish films
Indian horror thriller films
Films about blind people in India